Duke of Sanlúcar la Mayor is a hereditary title in the Peerage of Spain, accompanied by the dignity of Grandee and granted in 1625 by Philip IV to Gaspar de Guzmán, 3rd Count of Olivares and royal favourite to the king.

Since the title was granted to the Count of Olivares, the first holder became popularly known as the "Count-Duke of Olivares", by conjunction of the two titles. However, and by Royal Decree in 1882, the Countship of Olivares became officially known as the Countship-Dukedom of Olivares (condado-ducado de Olivares). The Dukedom of Sanlúcar la Mayor remains with the original denomination, and makes reference to the town of Sanlúcar la Mayor in the Province of Seville.

Dukes of Sanlúcar la Mayor (1625)

Gaspar de Guzmán y Pimentel, 1st Duke of Sanlúcar la Mayor
Enrique Felipe de Guzmán y Avecedo, 2nd Duke of Sanlúcar la Mayor
Gaspar Felipe de Guzmán y Velasco 3rd Duke of Sanlúcar la Mayor
Diego Messía y Felípez de Guzmán, 4th Duke of Sanlúcar la Mayor
Gaspar Messía y Spínola, 5th Duke of Sanlúcar la Mayor
Diego Francisco Messía y Córdoba, 6th Duke of Sanlúcar la Mayor
Antonio Gaspar de Moscoso Osorio y Aragón, 7th Duke of Sanlúcar la Mayor
Ventura Antonio de Osorio de Moscoso y Guzmán, 8th Duke of Sanlúcar la Mayor
Ventura Osorio de Moscoso y Fernández de Córdoba, 9th Duke of Sanlúcar la Mayor
Vicente Joaquín Osorio de Moscoso y Guzmán, 10th Duke of Sanlúcar la Mayor
Vicente Isabel Osorio de Moscoso y Álvarez de Toledo, 11th Duke of Sanlúcar la Mayor
Vicente Pío Osorio de Moscoso y Ponce de León, 12th Duke of Sanlúcar la Mayor
María Cristina Osorio de Moscoso y Carvajal, 13th Duchess of Sanlúcar la Mayor
Luis María Ruiz de Arana y Osorio de Moscoso, 14th Duke of Sanlúcar la Mayor
Luis María Ruiz de Arana y Martín de Oliva, 15th Duke of Sanlúcar la Mayor
José María Ruiz de Arana y Baüer, 16th Duke of Sanlúcar la Mayor
José María Ruiz de Arana y Montalvo, 17th Duke of Sanlúcar la Mayor
María Cristina Ruiz de Arana y Marone-Cinzano, 18th Duchess of Sanlúcar la Mayor

See also
List of dukes in the peerage of Spain
List of current Grandees of Spain

References

Bibliography
 

Dukedoms of Spain
Grandees of Spain
Lists of dukes
Lists of Spanish nobility